Stanisław Przybyszewski (7 May 1868 – 23 November 1927) was a Polish novelist, dramatist, and poet of the decadent naturalistic school. His drama is associated with the Symbolist movement. He wrote both in German and in Polish.

Life
Stanisław Feliks Przybyszewski was born in Lohdorf (Łojewo) near Kruschwitz (Kruszwica) in Prussia.  The son of a local teacher, Józef Przybyszewski, Stanisław attended a German gymnasium in Thorn (Toruń), graduating in 1889. He left for Berlin, where he first studied architecture and then medicine. It was there that he became fascinated by the philosophy of Nietzsche, began referring to himself as a Satanist and immersed himself into the bohemian life of the city.

In Berlin he lived with, but did not marry, Martha Foerder. They had had three children together; two before he left her to marry Dagny Juel on 18 August 1893 and one during his marriage to Dagny. From 1893 to 1898 he lived with Dagny (formerly a model for Edvard Munch), sometimes in Berlin and at others in Dagny's hometown of Kongsvinger, in Norway. In Berlin they met other artists at Zum schwarzen Ferkel.

In 1896 he was arrested in Berlin on suspicion of the murder of his common-law wife Martha, but released after it was determined that she had died of carbon monoxide poisoning. After Martha's death the children were sent to different foster homes. In the autumn of 1898, he and Dagny moved to Krakau (Kraków), in Austro-Hungarian Galicia, where he set himself up as the leader of a group of revolutionary young artists and as editor of their mouthpiece Życie (Life). He remained a fervent apostle of industrialism and self-expression.

He travelled to Lemberg (Lviv) and visited the poet and playwright Jan Kasprowicz. Przybyszewski started an affair with Kasprowicz's wife Jadwiga Gąsowska. Kasprowicz had married Jadwiga, his second wife, in 1893; his first marriage to Teodozja Szymańska in 1886 had ended in divorce after a few months.

In 1899 Przybyszewski abandoned Dagny and set up house with Jadwiga in Warsaw. Around this time he was also involved with Aniela Pająkówna, one of whose two daughters was Przybyszewski's. Dagny returned to Paris and was murdered by a young friend of hers, Władysław Emeryk, in Tbilisi in 1901.

In 1905 Przybyszewski and Jadwiga moved to Thorn (Toruń) where he attempted rehabilitation from his problems with alcohol. While there, Jadwiga's divorce was finalized and they married on 11 April 1905. Przybyszewski continued to struggle with alcoholism for the rest of his life.

In 1906 the couple moved to München (Munich), financed by the sale of the manuscript of the play Śluby (The Vows). During the war they lived for a short time in Bohemia (Czech Lands) and moved to newly re-established Poland in 1919.

In Posen (Poznań) he applied for the position of director of a literary theatre, but his work with German political brochures during the war prevented the appointment. He got a job working as a German translator for the post office. In 1920 he found similar work in the Free City of Danzig (now Gdańsk) with the railways. He lived in Danzig until 1924 and managed a Polish bookshop there.  After Danzig, he tried to settle in Toruń, Zakopane, and Bydgoszcz — all without success. Finally he found work in Warszawa (Warsaw), in the offices of the President. He lived in rooms in the old Royal Castle.

In 1927 he returned to the Kujawy region and died in Jaronty in November of that year, aged 59.

He wrote a number of successful novels, of which Homo Sapiens, the most popular, has been translated into English.

Works

Zur Psychologie des Individuums (1892)
De Profundis (1895)
Vigilien (1895)
Homo Sapiens (1896)
Die Synagoge des Satan (1897); Synagoga szatana (1899 Polish edition)
Satans Kinder (1897)
Das große Glück (1897)
Epipsychidion (1900)
Androgyne (1900)
Totentanz der Liebe (1902)
Erdensöhne (1905)
Gelübde (1906)
Polen und der heilige Krieg (1915)
Von Polens Seele. Ein Versuch (1917)
Der Schrei (1918)
Moi współcześni (1928)

Drama
 The Eternal Fairy-Tale
 The Golden Fleece
 The Snow (Schnee, 1903)
 For Happiness

See also
 Culture of Kraków
 List of Poles
 Stanisława Przybyszewska
 "Trajectory of a Comet: Poland's Arch-Decadent", by Brian R. Banks, in Wormwood, no.6 (Tartarus Press, United Kingdom)

References

External links

 Stanisław Przybyszewski at Culture.pl
 

1868 births
1927 deaths
People from Inowrocław County
People from the Province of Posen
19th-century Polish dramatists and playwrights
20th-century Polish dramatists and playwrights
19th-century Polish novelists
20th-century Polish novelists
Polish male novelists
Symbolist dramatists and playwrights
Officers of the Order of Polonia Restituta
19th-century Polish male writers
20th-century Polish male writers
Polish male dramatists and playwrights
Writers from Bydgoszcz
Polish writers in German